After the Axe is a 1982 Canadian drama film about executive firings directed by Sturla Gunnarsson. It was nominated for an Academy Award for Best Documentary Feature. The film explores the experiences of managers getting fired and the emergence of a new industry specialized in handling such terminations. Despite its Oscar nomination in the documentary category, After the Axe is closer to a docufiction film, made with the cooperation of members of the Canadian business community, which provided locations and helped script scenes during filming. The film's protagonist, D.R. "Biff" Wilson, is a composite character based on the filmmakers' conversations with fired executives, while the other Canadian executives play themselves.

Premise
Wilson, a senior marketing executive, is laid off from a food company after fifteen years of good service. Losing his status and security, he is relegated to the role of dependent house husband, resented by his children and shunned by former colleagues.

Cast
 James B. Douglas as Biff Wilson
 Janine Manatis as Wife
 Anne Christison as Daughter
 Randy Solomon as Son
 Roger Mattiussi as Narrator (voice)
 Eric Barton as Himself (relocation counsellor)
 Jim Paupst as Himself
 Stanley Warshaw as Himself (Forty Plus Club, N.Y.C.)

Production
The film was a co-production between the Canadian Broadcasting Corporation and National Film Board of Canada and was filmed in 1981. It had a budget of $452,017 (.

Reaction
Writing in Cinema Canada, Gary Lamphier stated that Gunnarsson and Lucas "establish Biff's decline and subsequent resurrection with economy and a sense of style."

See also
 Docufiction
 List of docufiction films

References

Works cited

External links

Watch After the Axe, National Film Board of Canada website

1982 films
1982 drama films
1980s business films
English-language Canadian films
1980s English-language films
Films directed by Sturla Gunnarsson
National Film Board of Canada films
Canadian docufiction films
Termination of employment in popular culture
1980s Canadian films